Sultan Al-Bargan (Arabic: سلطان البرقان) (15 February 1983 – 27 November 2018) was a Saudi Arabian football player. He died on 27 November 2018 due to complications from a stroke.

Al-Bargan appeared for Al-Hilal in the group stage of the 2006 AFC Champions League. He also played for the Al-Hilal side which reached the semi-finals of the 2010 AFC Champions League.

References

Al Hilal SFC players
Ettifaq FC players
1983 births
2018 deaths
Al-Shoulla FC players
Al-Raed FC players
Saudi Arabian footballers
Saudi Professional League players
Association football midfielders